The FIBA Oceania Championship for Men 1989 was the qualifying tournament of FIBA Oceania for the 1990 FIBA World Championship. Australia won the series 2–0.

Teams that did not enter

Results

External links
 FIBA Archive

FIBA Oceania Championship
Championship
1989 in New Zealand basketball
1989 in Australian basketball
International basketball competitions hosted by Australia
Australia men's national basketball team games
New Zealand men's national basketball team games
Basketball in New South Wales